Getting to This  was the second album by British blues-rock band Blodwyn Pig, released in 1970. The album was the band's last until a brief reunion in the 1990s. Peter Banks joined from Yes after the recording of Getting to This, but the band split up at the end of 1970. The album reached number 8 on the UK album chart.

Track listing

"Drive Me"  – 3:19 (Abrahams)
"Variations on Nainos"  – 3:47 (Abrahams)
"See My Way"  – 5:04 (Abrahams)
"Long Bomb Blues"  – 1:07 (Abrahams)
"The Squirreling Must Go On"  – 4:22 (Abrahams, Pyle)
"San Francisco Sketches"  – 8:11 (Lancaster)
a) "Beach Scape" 
b) "Fisherman's Wharf" 
c) "Telegraph Hill"
d) "Close the Door, I'm Falling Out of the Room"
"Worry"  – 3:43 (Pyle)
"Toys"  – 3:03 (Abrahams)
"To Rassman"  – 1:29 (Berg)
"Send Your Son to Die"  – 4:25 (Abrahams)
"Summer Day" (bonus track on CD release)  – 3:48 (Abrahams, Pyle)
"Walk On the Water" (bonus track on CD release)  – 3:42 (Abrahams)

Personnel

 Mick Abrahams – guitar, vocals, seven-string guitar, tenor guitar
 Jack Lancaster – flute, violin, electric violin, tenor sax, baritone sax, soprano sax, phoon horn, cornet
 Andy Pyle – electric bass, six-string bass
 Ron Berg – drums, tympani
 Graham Waller – piano ("Drive Me", "Beach Scape")

References

External links 
 Blodwyn Pig – Getting to This (1970) album review by Richie Unterberger, credits & releases at AllMusic.com
 Blodwyn Pig – Getting to This (1970) album releases & credits at Discogs.com
 Blodwyn Pig – Getting to This (1970) album credits & user reviews at ProgArchives.com
 Blodwyn Pig – Getting to This (1970) album to be listened as stream at Play.Spotify.com

Blodwyn Pig albums
1970 albums
Albums produced by Andy Johns
Chrysalis Records albums